The Brèche de la Meije (el. 3357 m) is a high mountain pass in the Dauphiné Alps in Savoie in southeastern France.

It is in the massif of Écrins in the Écrins National Park.

It is an easy climb and an excellent starting course. The climb from the bivouac to the foot of the glacier of Etançons takes 2½ hour. From the foot of the glacier to the summit takes 1¼ hours.

See also
 List of mountain passes

References
Julien Beausseron site
SkiTour

Mountain passes of Auvergne-Rhône-Alpes
Mountain passes of the Alps